Tolokiwa Island, also known as Lottin Island, is an island in the Bismarck Sea. The island is volcanic in origin and part of the Bismarck Archipelago.

Description 
Tolokiwa Island was built up by a series of volcanic eruptions during the Pleistocene epoch. The well-vegetated island is an important natural site for birds, and is home to several species of resident birds (which it unusually shares with nearby islands). Tolokiwa is also home to a subspecies of Turdus Poliocephalus.

The island sustained damage during the 1888 eruption of nearby Ritter Island, which caused a tsunami to hit Tolokiwa.

References 

Bismarck Archipelago
Islands of Papua New Guinea